Raleigh County may refer to:
 Raleigh County, West Virginia, United States
 Raleigh County, New South Wales, Australia